Fey: Primera Fila is the acoustic album by Mexican pop singer Fey. The live album, part of Sony's "Primera Fila" series, was shot and recorded in Mexico on June 22, 2012 in front of fans and special guests on an invite-only basis.   The live album has new renditions of songs from her first three albums, as well as three new tracks. The album features a documentary of the process as well as a live video recording of the concert.

Track listing 
 Muévelo
 Te Pertenezco
 Frío
 Gatos en el Balcón
 Desmargaritando el Corazón
 Ni tú ni nadie
 Me Haces Tanta Falta
 El Cielo Puede Esperar (featuring Aleks Syntek)
 Subidón
 Me Enamoro de Ti
 Azúcar Amargo
 La Noche Se Mueve
 Media Naranja

Charts

Certifications and sales

Promotion & Tour 
Fey has promoted the album by performing most of the tracks live in some of Mexico's most popular television shows.  The day of the album's release, it was announced Fey would begin her world tour named "Todo Lo Que Soy," starting in Mexico City's National Auditorium, where Fey had set the record for the most sold out performances by a female artist. Her first show for the tour was on February 22, 2013 and future tour date announcements followed for about a year. Fey has stated that she will perform songs from all of her career-making albums.

Setlist
 Frio
 Te Pertenezco
 Barco a Venus
 Diselo Con Flores
 Gatos En El Balcon
 Desmargaritando El Corazon
 Me Haces Tanta Falta
 Canela
 Subidon
 Ni Tu Ni Nadie
 Me Enamoro De Ti
 Tierna La Noche
 El Cielo Puede Esperar (only February 22, 2013) with Aleks Syntek
 Cielo Liquido
 Lentamente
 Se Lo Que Vendra
 Dressing to Kill
 Azucar Amargo
 Muevelo
 Media Naranja
 La Noche Se Mueve

References 

 

2012 live albums
Fey (singer) live albums
Spanish-language live albums